Udaari (title from ; lit: To fly) is an Urdu and Punjabi language social Pakistani television series that was created and co-produced by Kashf Foundation andMomina Duraid for Hum TV. It focused on the social and economic marginalisation of citizens in Pakistani rural society alongside highlighting deeply rooted issues such as child sexual abuse, gender discrimination and violence against women. It was aired from 10 April 2016 to 4 September 2016. The show is written by Farhat Ishtiaq and directed by Mohammed Ehteshamuddin. The plot of Udaari centres on the families of two Punjabi villagers Sheedan and Sajida, with Sheedan facing discrimination as she is in the performing arts and is looked down upon as belonging to the "Marasis" which is derogatory term when referring to musicians. On the other hand is the story of Sajda, a widow and a struggling single mother trying to bring up her daughter. The story goes on to show the struggles of the next generation, their daughters Meera and Zebo and how they overcome the many hurdles and barriers they face, while Zebo has to deal with the psychological, physical and emotional aspects of sexual assault and the shame that is associated with it. The dialogue "I am not a victim but a survivor", became the life line for many CSA survivors and post Udaari a great deal of discussion and debate was undertaken regarding how to address child sexual abuse at all levels.  

Udaari has an ensemble cast with Bushra Ansari as Sheedan, Samiya Mumtaz as Sajida, Urwa Hocane as Ameera, Farhan Saeed as Arsh, Ahsan Khan as Imtiaz, and Hina Altaf Khan/Areesha Ahsan as Zebo. The show is set in the village of Mirpur and urban areas of Punjab.

 Udaari received positive reviews from critics and audiences throughout its broadcast, critics considered the sensitive issues within the story's arc well drafted and well composed, and also lauded the entire cast's performance, it also scored highest ratings in 2016 and was ranked as the highest rated TV series of 2016 season. At the 5th Hum Awards, Udaari won the most for the ceremony including, Best Drama Serial - Jury and Best Drama Serial - Popular for Momina Duraid.

Plot

It is the story of two different worlds, the urban and the rural as well as highlighting prevalent issues in modern society. The series depicts the lives of two neighbouring families in a village, and the struggle of a group of four friends living in the city, trying to pursue a music career. In the village, it focuses on two close neighbours, Rashida and Sajida. Rashida (nicknamed as Sheedaan) along with her husband Maajid, daughter Meera and son Ejaz are local musicians who earn through singing and entertaining people at weddings, because of which they are discriminated and criticised in the society, being termed as Marasi. Whereas Sajida, Parvez's widow, works as a maid in a distant house. She runs the household, cares for herself and her 10-year-old daughter, named Zebo. Simultaneously, in urban city Lahore, resides a group of four students, Maleeha, Haris, Arsh and Farwa who want to pursue a music carrier. Meera is in a complicated relationship with Illyas who happens to be Sajida's nephew. He always warned her to stop singing or he will break his relationship. Imtiaz, Parvez's best friend, proposed Sajida for marriage who first showed reluctance but later married him for Zebo's sake. On their wedding, Majid passes away which makes Imtiaz closer to Sheedaan's family resulting in his negative sexual desires for Meera. One day, when Sajida and Zebo are not home, Imtiaz attempts to sexually abuse Meera, but she escapes from there. This results in a dispute between Sajida and Sheedaan where Sajida claims Meera's intentions were wrong, refuses to believe her and supports Imtiaz. After this Sheedan's breaks off all her relations with Sajida and Illyas breaks off his relationship with Meera. On the other hand, Farwa is forced by her parents to bid adieu to her music career. Milli and her mother Muneera (who runs an NGO) visit the village for a wedding where she sees Meera tearfully singing and records her music. The band then visit Meera's house and take her on as a replacement singer for Farwa. After immense arguments and disputes, Arsh and Meera grow close to each other. The band successfully wins the music competition, leaving the village shocked seeing Meera on Television. Complications begin when Imtiaz's sexual desires arise for Zebo. One rainy afternoon while Sajida is at work, Imtiaz lures Zebo into a room and rapes her, she is threatened to keep silent otherwise he threatens to kill Zebo herself and her mother. Back in Lahore, Meera gains fame and recognition all over the country, she earns enough money to purchase a house and settles in Lahore with her family.

Cast

 Samiya Mumtaz as Sajida Bibi; nicknamed as Sajo 
 Bushra Ansari as Rasheeda Bibi: nicknamed as Sheedaan 
 Ahsan Khan as Imtiaz Ali Sheikh
 Urwa Hocane as Ameera Majid; nicknamed as Meera
 Farhan Saeed as Taimoor Arshad nicknamed as Arsh
 Hina Altaf as Zeb-un-Nisa Pervaiz; nicknamed Zebo
 Laila Zuberi as Muneera Khalid
 Malika Zafar as Maleeha Khalid 
 Maryam Fatima as Farwa Murad
 Ins-e-Yazdan as Ejaz Majid 
 Adnan Saeed as Haris Khalid
 Aqeel Abbas as Iqbal 
 Haris Waheed as Ilyas
 Rehan Sheikh as Majid
 Behroze Sabzwari as Khalid 
 Ambar Wajid as Afrooz
 Aliya Jamshed as Razia
 Arjumand Hussain as Ahmad 
 Rashida Tabassum as Durdana
 Saife Hassan as Malik Iftikhar Hussain
 Akbar Islam as Imtiaz's Lawyer

Child stars

 Areesha Ahsan as Zebo
 Saad as Ejaz

Special appearances
 Hassan Sheheryar Yasin as himself
 Hadiqa Kiani as herself
 Emo as himself
 Babar Zaheer as himself

Episodes

Production

Development
Udaari was developed by Hum TV's senior producer Momina Duraid of MD Productions, the channel hired the award-winning director Mohammed Ehteshamuddin to direct the series. Story of serial is written by award-winning writer Farhat Ishtiaq. It was Ishtiaq's first screenplay without a novel release, she has previously worked thrice with Momina, when she wrote mega-hit drama serials in Pakistan television history Humsafar, Mata-e-Jaan Hai Tu, and Diyar-e-Dil.

Song composition is done by Sahir Ali Bagga and Sohail Haider while background music is given by Mohsin AllahDitta who chose singers like Bushra Ansari, Hadiqa Kiani and Farhan Saeed for singing. It was Insari and Kiani's second collaboration after Pakistan Idol. Kiani and Saeed collaborated on the title song and also provided the vocals for the characters of Meeran and Arsh (portrayed by Saeed). There were discussions laid on its time slot, previously it was announced that the show will air on Saturdays replacing Durad's Gul-e-Rana. However, due to promotional reasons and Slot importance the show was given time slot of Sundays, 8:00 pm, whereas the long running series, Abroo was given a time slot of Saturdays. Udaari was initially planned to be released in 2017 after completion of filming but Duraid decided to release it in 2016 to For higher ratings to her channel. It was released in April and was planned to end along with Hum TV's Mann Mayal thereby both the shows were slotted to maintain Sunday and Monday slots to bring higher Television Rating Points (TRP) to them for the future.

Casting

Producer, writer and Director mutually chose the cast which includes Bushra Ansari, Samiya Mumtaz, Ahsan Khan, Urwa Hocane, Farhan Saeed and Hina Altaf Khan and Areesha Ahsan to play the leading roles of Sheedhan, Sajida, Imtiaz, Meera, Arsh and Zebo.

Veteran Actress Bushra Ansari was cast to portray the role of Rashida Bibi after her appraisal for her role in Kis Ki Ayeegi Baraat series, and Bilqees Kaur. The actress received critical acclaim within the pilot episode, according to her, this role was a challenge.

Urwa Hocane and Farhan Saeed marked their second appearance together as a couple being previously acted in Ary Digital's Mere Ajnaabi.

Udaari was Samiya Mumtaz's second collaboration with Momina Duraid and Mohammed Ehteshamuddin, she previously acted in drama-serial Sadqay Tumhare after which she was finalised to portray the role of Sajida. Alongside Mumtaz, actress Hina Altaf Khan was cast to portray series's the pivotal character of Zebo. Zebo's role was initially portrayed by Areesha Ahsan as child artist. Udaari was Ahsan Khan's first portrayal of a negative role. Khan was cast to portray the role of 'Imtiaz a pedophile, this role was initially offered to actor Mikaal Zulfiqar who rejected it due to its grey personality. Speaking about difficulty in portraying this role, Khan states that Even while reading the script, I could not digest these scenes. It is definitely the most difficult character to portray on-screen, further sommecfting on his role Khan states Such abuse leaves the child traumatised forever. My maid's child was suffering from it and that's what made me realise that I need to spread awareness.

Production also chose Behroze Sabzwari, Laila Zuberi, Maryam Fatima, Rehan Sheikh, Haris Waheed and Aqeel Abbas for the supporting roles of Khalid, Muneera, Farwa, Majid, Illyas and Balay respectively. Sabzwari received critical acclaim for his role of Tajamul in Duraid's Diyar-e-Dil, he was selected to portray Khalid alongside Zuberi who joined the series after her previous project Mann Mayal with Duraid.

Music and sound

All the music and songs of Udaari were composed by musician Sahir Ali Bagga and Sohail Haider with Mubarak and Zahid being the sound engineer. The background score is given by Bilal Allahdittah,  the lyrics for the OST were penned down by Imran Raza. The OST Sajna Ve Sajna was sung by Farhan Saeed and Hadiqa Kiani.  It marks the return of Hadiqa Kiani to Hum TV, since she performed for the channel's hit drama series Zindagi Gulzar Hai's title song. Veteran actress and vocalist Bushra Ansari performed only Punjabi music for various episodes. Rahat Fateh Ali Khan's Samjhawanki was taken and performed by Hadiqa Kiani for the series.

Udaari's full OST was released in May 2016. Saajna Ve Saajna received critical acclaim for Sahir Ali Bagga and Sohail Haider for comping and Hadiqa Kiani and Farhan Saeed for vocals. The Series dominated the Top No.1 rank according to Pakistan's Official Music App Taazi.  "Mein Tenu Samjhawanki" received critical acclaim and success.

Filming and locations
Principal photography and filming began in February 2016 and finishes in June 2016, with approximately 25 episodes. Shooting was extensively done in Multan's village Mirpur Khas and in Karachi. Udaari's first promo was released in March 2016. Chief editing and cinematography was done by Azhar Ali who edited the series.

Post Production and Pre-release

Press Conference
On 7 April 2016 a press conference was held for Udaari. The programme, hosted by Shanaz Ramzi, CEO Starlinks PR began the proceedings with the series's introduction. Producer Momina Duraid said that some of the actors came out of their comfort zones for the roles that they portrayed. Furthermore, Roshaneh Zafar from Kashf Foundation reflected on common rape cases in Kasur city which led them to produce a screenplay for awarenesses against child-sexual abuse. Director Ehteshamuddin, revealed how challengingvit had been to get the writer, Farhat Ishtiaq to write the script, as not only was the subject a difficult one to portray on screen but it also needed a script that was very close to reality. Bushra Ansari shared her role which is that of a woman who is extremely confident but unrefined, and embodies the real culture of Pakistan's rural areas. She regaled the media present with her quick vivid descriptions and stories painted about the time on set in Mirpur Khas.

Music

The title song of Udaari was composed by musician Sahir Ali Bagga and Sohail Haider, the lyrics were penned down by Imran Raza. The OST was sung by Farhan Saeed and Hadiqa Kiani.  It marks the return of Hadiqa Kiani to Hum TV, since she performed for the channel's hit drama series Zindagi Gulzar Hai's title song.

The Soundtrack is produced along with the series production by Momina Duraid and Kashf Productions. The original music was recorded by the production house itself while few songs used in the show were covers of previous classics, including the song Mein Tenu Samjhawanki which was sung by Hadiqa Kiani. Actress Bushra Ansari revamped classic Punjabi Pakistani songs.

Udaari's full OST was released in May 2016. Saajna Ve Saajna received critical acclaim for Sahir Ali Bagga and Sohail Haider for comping and Hadiqa Kiani and Farhan Saeed for vocals. The Series dominated the Top No.1 rank according to Pakistan's Official Music App Taazi.  "Mein Tenu Samjhawanki" received critical acclaim and success.

Track listing

Broadcast and release

Broadcast
Udaari was originally decided to release in September after completion of filming in July and post production delays, but instead Production decided to release it in April. With its release, it was initially decided to premiere on 9 April 2016, and air every Saturday night with higher reception, replacing Gul-e-Rana which had maintained the slot with a high viewership for the channel. But to maintain their Sunday slot, the channel instead released Udaari on 10 April 2016, airing every Sunday night, replacing Abro, which was then shifted to Saturdays.  The channel aired a weekly episode for approximately 30–45 minutes (without commercials). It was ordered and compromised 25 episodes. It was aired on Hum Europe in UK, on Hum TV USA in USA and Hum TV Mena on UAE, with same timings and premiered date. All International broadcasting aired the series in accordance with their standard times.

Homa media and digital release
Udaari was released on Hum TV's youtube channel alongside its airing but in 2017, it was taken off. It was also released on a DVD set on late November 2016. In January 2017, iflix app streamed Udaari on a subscription basis but was pulled off by the channel in 2018. In December 2019, ‘’Udaari’’ was digitally released again by Hum TV on their youtube channel with all its music removed. Furthermore, the show is also available on MX Player.

Reception

Ratings

Udaari's ratings were announced by Hum TV on their official Facebook page. Udaari premiered with 4.9 Television Rating Points (TRPs), the third episode also scored 4.9 TRPs. With the fourth episode, ratings increased to 5.5 TRPs and with episode six it gained 4.0 TRPs. On its eighth episode, Udaari scored a hit by jumping to 7.1 TRPs, the series averaged 6 TRPs till episode thirteen where as on episode fourteen the series once again bought a higher point of 7.3 TRP, next week the series bought Its highest ratings of 7.8 TRP.  Udaari was Ramadan's most watched show where viewership decreases, the series received higher viewership leaving behind several gameshows. On its sixteenth episode, Udaari received 6.2 TRPs, it was expected to score the same next week but it peaked at 7.3 TRPs on its seventeenth episode. On Its eighteenth episode Udaari moved further receiving 7.8 TRPs. Close to its finale Udaari peaked at 6.0 TRPs on its Twentieth episode and 6.6TRPs on its Twenty first episode. The Last episode of Udaari averaged 6.8TRP at 20:00, after 21:00 it averaged 7.9 TRPs peaking at points above 10 TRP's.

Viewership

On episode eleven, Udaari scored 11.5 Million Viewership followed by episode twelve which gained 11.9 Million viewers, with further episodes it averaged viewership in millions. After Averaging a viewership of 70 Thousand viewers till episode seventeen, the eighteenth episode gained a record breaking viewership for the series of 16.5 Million viewers. On a scale of Top ten shows of Pakistan in 2016,Udaari had dominated the No. #2 spot where as another Hum TV series, Mann Mayal dominated the No. #1 position. Both the shows bought a higher reception for the channel. The series competed with Geo TV's most expensive Pakistani series, Mor Mahal which was then shifted to 22:00 slot between the course of show.

Episode Ranking

Critical appreciation
Actors Bushra Ansari and Ahsan Khan earned the most critical acclaim in 2016 for their portrayals. Commenting on his character's acclaim, Khan stated It's a huge honour for me to receive this appreciation from one of the greatest villains of all times. Imtiaz's character was also internationally recognised, with earning critical acclaim from Indian artists Reena Roy and Alka Yagnik. Speaking about series reviews from India, Khan states Udaari isn't being aired in India currently but these two stars have been watching my show on YouTube. I really appreciate their love and support.

Writing for Dawn News, Sadaf Haider moderately reviewed the series praising its parody if culture saying, Udaari reads like a brightly colored map of Pakistani society today. Divisions of class and wealth are amply illustrated but so are everyday human interactions. Furthermore, Haider praises the casting stating, Udaari has a strong star cast and it looks as if we will see some great performances. She concluded her review saying that Udaari seems like a safe bet for some informative and enjoyable hour every Sunday. In April issue of The Express Tribune, Udaari was ranked third behind Mann Mayal and Dillagi'''.

However, Sheeba Khan of Dawn praised the series script and characters saying, ..Udaari, gave an astounding opening this week with its larger than life first episode. After watching the serial, one is blown away by the phenomenal acting and superb characterization in this drama. Moreover, Khan praised Udaari's premier and culture saying Udaari has a very impressive opening with flamboyant characters and their dull sides of life. Every actor is immersed into the feel of his and her role, and gives a magnificent performance. All of them have acquired Punjabi accents with so much ease and grace that it will make you think as if they are not just characters, but are real people from an actual rural setting. She concluded her issue praising Farhat Ishtiaq's writing saying The best part about Udaari is its characterization of each actor, for which the writer Farhat Ishtiaq should be applauded.Sadaf Haider of Dawn News praised Udaari's direction saying, "Udaari's success lies firmly with director Ehtashamuddin's masterful ability to translate Farhat Ishtiaq's wonderful script flawlessly to the screen. He has elicited some great performances from his team and made sure this wide-ranging storyline did not lose its way". Furthermore, she stated that even after Seven episodes, "Uddari is successfully topping rating charts". Talking about same publication, Sheeba Khan praised the Urban and rural life combination for Dawn's review, Khan states, "The director has managed to extract the best out of all of his actors and has shown a great amount of sensitivity to what should be projected on screen. Sexual abuse is a huge issue in Pakistan, yet for some odd reason has become a taboo and cannot be spoken about". Lastly she praised the theme of child abuse and societal issues by saying, "Pairing a debate on sexual abuse with a commentary on parenting is a smart move, and just shows how, of all the plays running right now, Udaari is not only intelligent and real, it highlights issues in society that need attention so they can be prevented. It shows that victims need not keep quiet and that their families should be their first line of defence". Further more Sadaf Haider praised the roles of Ahsan Khan and Samiya Mumtaz praising Sajida's positivity for her Daughter Zebo, according to her reviews, was Mumtaz's most powerful role, where she portrayed the role of a village women with an extreme powerful getup sparking her role.

Dawn News's article Sadaf Haider  praised the Twenty first episode of Udaari with series giving its message, Haider praised the character of Zebo and Arsh stating, "Most significant of all, instead of lecturing Zebo to do the right thing, Arsh becomes a true hero by empowering her and showing her a way to take control of her life. He explains that any shame or guilt is not her burden to carry; all of it should be firmly placed on the perpetrator's shoulders, never the victim's."

While talking to local media about, Urwa Hocane portraying the role of Meera discussed the importance of the drama and social taboos like child abuse and rape. Hocane said, "It's about time for women to talk about this. I think Udaari has brought a change. The people who wanted to ban it couldn't because of the people who wanted the drama to bring about a change. Girls don't speak about such things. I am probably destined to change that mindset." Furthermore, talking about her role of Meera being a local musician, Hocane stated,  "I want to change the mindset of people. Bushra jee told me that the word miraasi comes from miraas. You should be proud of it rather than feel horrible about it."

In addition to critical reviews Imtiaz's character received wide media attention and has been a subject of popularity since the beginning, commenting in his role Ahsan Khan stated that "Even while reading the script, I could not digest these scenes. It is definitely the most difficult character to portray on-screen". Moreover, Khan decided to donate 20% of his fee from the serial to the victims of the heinous crime, he also began working with an NGO to make his contributions more substantial and concrete. Khan commented on the series theme "child abuse" stating, "Such abuse leaves the child traumatised forever. My maid's child was suffering from it and that's what made me realise that I need to spread awareness." commenting on critical acclaim Khan stated "It's a huge honour for me to receive this appreciation from one of the greatest villains of all times." Khan's negative role of child molester earned him critical acclaim.

Moreover, Fatima Awan of Review It praised the role of rape-victim Zebo, according to her Udaari played a major role in educating their audience against communal crimes. Apart from sexual abuse, Awan also commented on other societal issues such as politician's negative support and bribing police which plays a major role in societies. Role of Zebo was furthermore praised where Awan states that every girl should stand for her justice and live her life not as a victim but a survivor. Further more Awan commented on the final episode of Udaari where she praised the roles of Zebo, Sajida, Imtiaz, Arsh, Muneera, Meera and Sheedan. With Arsh (Portrayed by Farhan Saeed) Awan praised the message he gave against child sexual abuse and for the favour of Women rights, she praised the roles of Sajida and Zebo where the two finally sealed justice and of Munnera educating her society. According to her review, Udaari has proved o be the major commercial success of 2016.

Controversies

On 10 May 2016, 'Pakistan Electronic Media Regulatory Authority' (PEMRA) issued a notice against Udaari calming that it had inappropriate content for Television audiences. However, on 25 May 2016 Momina Duraid responded PREMRA regarding the reality of society and responded the issue, as a result the issue was taken back. Further more Duraid stated that, We feel that Pemra might have been misled by a group of people who would never want our society to raise and flourish. We will explain our view point and present it with evidence. We are attaching articles and feedback supporting Udaari with the our reply. Following this Udaari received support from several audiences and various TV Artists including actress Yumna Zaidi .

 Awards and accolades 

 Impact Udaari received global recognition due to its tackling the taboo themes with authenticity and sensitivity, which got it huge viewership and global acclaim. Following the success of Udaari, the producers invested in making series on taboo subjects for television such as Khuda Mera Bhi Hai (2016, deals with the status of intersex individuals in the society), Sammi'' (2017, deals with the evil practice of Vani) which was previously dominated by domestic stories.

See also
 2016 in Pakistani television
 List of programs broadcast by Hum TV
 Mann Mayal
 Humsafar
 Diyar-e-Dil
 Mata-e-Jaan Hai Tu

References

External links
 
 
 

Hum TV
Hum Network Limited
Hum TV original programming
Pakistani telenovelas
Pakistani romantic drama television series
Serial drama television series
MD Productions
Television series by MD Productions
Television series created by Momina Duraid
Urdu-language television shows
2016 Pakistani television series debuts
2016 Pakistani television series endings